Smithsonian is a Washington Metro station at the National Mall in Washington, D.C., United States. The side platformed station was opened on July 1, 1977, and is operated by the Washington Metropolitan Area Transit Authority (WMATA). It is a stop on the Blue, Orange and Silver Lines. The station's south entrance is at the southwest corner of Independence Avenue and 12th Street, Southwest, the street elevator is at the northwest corner of the same intersection, and the north entrance is on the south side of the Mall near Jefferson Drive, Southwest.

The station is named for its proximity to the Smithsonian Institution's museums and is close to the Washington Monument, the Tidal Basin and other tourist attractions on and near the National Mall. The station is also near several federal office buildings, including those of the Department of Agriculture and the Department of Energy.

History

The station opened on July 1, 1977. Orange Line service to the station began upon the line's opening on November 20, 1978. Silver Line service at Smithsonian station began on July 26, 2014.

Near this station, Metro had its first fatalities, which occurred on January 13, 1982, when a train derailed. On the same day, Air Florida Flight 90 crashed into the 14th Street Bridge. The two events closed the federal government in the Washington Metropolitan Area.
  
The Smithsonian station was closed all day on the Fourth of July from 2002 to 2008, as its north entrance is within the secure perimeter established around the National Mall during Independence Day events.  Metro stopped closing Smithsonian station on July 4 beginning in 2009.

On April 14, 2016, Metro proposed to change the name of the station adding "National Mall" to the station name.

On June 25, 2017, "National Mall" was added as a subtitle to "Smithsonian".

From March 19, 2020, until June 28, 2020, this station was closed due to the COVID-19 pandemic.

From January 15 to January 21, 2021, this station was closed because of security concerns due to the 2020 Inauguration.

Station layout

Notable places nearby 
 Several Federal Government buildings, including:
 Bureau of Engraving and Printing
 United States Department of Agriculture
 United States Department of Energy
 National Mall
 Several Smithsonian museums, nearest are:
 Arthur M. Sackler Gallery
 Arts and Industries Building
 Freer Gallery
 Hirshhorn Museum
 National Museum of African Art
 National Museum of American History
 National Museum of Natural History
National Museum of African American History and Culture
 Smithsonian Institution Building (The "Castle")
 Tidal Basin (where the cherry blossoms bloom)
 United States Holocaust Memorial Museum
 Washington Monument

References

External links
 

 The Schumin Web Transit Center: Smithsonian Station
 The Mall Entrance (North Entrance) is at coordinates 
 The Independence Avenue and 12th Street SW Entrance (South Entrance) is at coordinates 
 The Street Elevator Entrance is at coordinates 
 Jefferson Drive entrance from Google Maps Street View
 Independence Avenue entrance from Google Maps Street View

Stations on the Blue Line (Washington Metro)
Stations on the Orange Line (Washington Metro)
Stations on the Silver Line (Washington Metro)
Washington Metro stations in Washington, D.C.
Railway stations in the United States opened in 1977
1977 establishments in Washington, D.C.
Railway stations located underground in Washington, D.C.